Qvarqvare I Jaqeli (1298 – 1361) was a Georgian prince (mtavari) and ruler of Samtskhe during 1334-1361.

His father was Atabeg Sargis II Jaqeli, the son of Beka I Jaqeli.  In 1334, after his father's death, Qvarqvare became George V The Brilliant's vassal and was appointed as Atabeg of Samtskhe by King.

References

House of Jaqeli
Atabegs of Samtskhe
14th-century people from Georgia (country)
1361 deaths
1298 births